A Week in December is a novel by British writer Sebastian Faulks, published in 2009. The story is set in London, England over a week in December 2007.

Plot
The book begins with the elaborate seating plan of a dinner party. It ends once that dinner party has taken place. Sophie, the wife of a newly elected Member of Parliament, must decide whom to place where.  Several of the protagonists are present at the dinner, and the storylines are, to a large extent, tied up as a result of what occurs there.
In the course of the book the reader is introduced to John Veals, a hedge fund trader who is arguably the most important character. He is a ruthless businessman, whose immense fortune seems to have become meaningless. He is more interested in the chase, the challenge of acquiring more and more capital. As he embarks on one of the riskiest deals of his life, his family is about to be torn apart. But does he even care?

An unsuccessful barrister is assigned to represent a young female tube driver; a Scottish Muslim is drawn into a radical group, while a postgraduate literature student looks on; a Polish footballer tries hard to adapt to life in a Premier League team, while his Russian model girlfriend adjusts to life in London. A pickle millionaire enlists the help of R. Tranter, novelist and critic, to prepare for his meeting with the Queen when he receives his OBE.

Themes
The book's peripheral characters play an important part in the general theme of the book. Life for John's wife, in particular, is lonely and boring. John can't engage with her at any level, her children are mysterious teenagers and she feels isolated. She and her circle of friends measure each other on how rich or how thin they are. Radley Graves, a secondary school teacher, becomes dangerously entangled in the fantasy world of "Parallax" the virtual reality game where his character is a sexually aggressive bully. Amanda can't let go of the past, when she used to rule the roost in London now stuck in the country with her alcoholic husband Roger, she can't wait to get back at the least opportunity.

The novel touches on themes that are issues that we face every day: mental illness, terrorism, the recession, and a sense of trying to survive in a world of madness, consumerism and greed.
Although the novel explores grim reality, there is hope, and love, a thin seam, but nonetheless, still there.

External links
Guardian review
Review in the Sunday Times
BBC video clip of the author discussing his book

Novels by Sebastian Faulks
2009 British novels
Fiction set in 2007
Novels set in London
Hutchinson (publisher) books